Pandurangapuram is a neighborhood situated on the coastal part of Visakhapatnam City, India. The area, which falls under the local administrative limits of Greater Visakhapatnam Municipal Corporation, is about 4 km from the Dwaraka Nagar which is city centre. Pandurangapuram is located at the besides of Bay of Bengal and its totally surrounded by Maharanipeta, Kirlampudi Layout and Daspalla Hills.

Overview
This area is one of the more affluent residential areas in city.

Transport
APSRTC routes

References

Neighbourhoods in Visakhapatnam